General elections were held for the first time in Japan on 1 July 1890. Voters elected 300 members of the House of Representatives of the Diet of Japan in what was the first example of a popularly elected national assembly in Asia (as the Ottoman Chamber of Deputies was elected indirectly).

Background
The elections for the lower house of the Diet were held in accordance with provisions of the new Meiji Constitution, which had been promulgated in 1889.

The elections had limited suffrage, with only male citizens 25 years of age and over, who had paid 15 Japanese Yen or more in national taxes, and who had been resident in their prefecture for at least a year, qualified to vote. The number of eligible voters who met this requirement was 450,872 people out of a total Japanese population of 39,933,478 (1.13%). The high tax requirement meant that voter roles were heavily weighed towards rural landlords and urban entrepreneurs. In terms of social class, 91% were commoners, and 9% were ex-samurai. Residents of the prefectures in Honshū, Kyūshū and Shikoku participated; residents in Hokkaidō and Okinawa (as “territories”) were excluded from this election. About 95% of those eligible to vote actually cast ballots, although there was no penalty for not doing so.

Only male citizens 30 years of age and over, who were not members of the kazoku peerage or of the imperial family or its branches were allowed to become candidates for office in the lower house.  The number of seats in the lower house was 300, divided into 214 single-seat districts and 43 two-seat districts, which were contested by 1,243 candidates. The election went smoothly and without violence reported.

Results

Post-election composition by prefecture

Aftermath
The first Diet session was summoned on 25 November; the two opposing forces confronted each other for the first time in the arena of practical Japanese politics. The mintō (liberal parties), which included the Liberal Party, Rikken Kaishintō and their affiliates) held a combined strength of 171 seats, forming a majority.

Notes

References

Politics of the Empire of Japan
Japan
General election
General elections in Japan
July 1890 events
Election and referendum articles with incomplete results